Single's Inferno is a South Korean  reality television series on Netflix. South Korean singer and Super Junior member Kyuhyun, rapper Hanhae, actress Lee Da-hee, and comedian Hong Jin-kyung, serve as the hosts of the show.

Concept
The show's main concept takes the idea of survival shows and mixes it with the idea of fighting for their intended love interest. Participants are left on an island and the mission is to leave it. The location of the shoot is close by to Seoul, South Korea, being only an hour away.

Twelve singles are meant to find their love on this island through challenges and getting to know each other throughout the season. Something unique to the show is its way of capturing awkward moments between participants and how friendship was formed in addition to love. It formed relationships and was a deep dive in learning about one another, not just about the shallow desires of physical relationships.

In the show, couples are formed through free dates and dates in Paradise. In Singles Inferno, the deserted island the contestants reside in requires them to cook their own food, not use their electronics, and draw their own water. Any discussion of age and occupation is also not allowed. The only thing to do is to date and win games in order to have the opportunity to escape the island. During the first episode, contestants are asked to write to a potential interest through postcard. However, the chosen interest does not have to stay the same throughout the show. The games and free dates within the deserted island gives contestants the time to make the decision of who they would like to go to Paradise with.

Paradise is the direct opposite of Singles Inferno. It is a luxurious island where paired contestants can enjoy dates with room service and fun activities in their paid hotels. It is the ultimate goal for contestants, as it is also the place where people can ask about their interests' age and occupation. People can only go to Paradise if they choose a person that also chose them to go with. 

The final couple matches are made in the last episode. The women are placed at different points of the island. If the male contestant is interested in a woman, he will walk up to her. If she accepts him and takes his hand, they both can leave Singles Inferno together as a match.

Season 1

Singles

Women

Men

Coupling history

  Male Contestant
  Female Contestant
  Sent a letter to
  Chose/Chosen for date in Inferno
  Chose and didn't go to Paradise
  Successfully paired and went to Paradise or Chosen/Chose someone to go to Paradise
  Failed to make a final pair
  Made a final pair

Season 2

Singles

Women

Men

Coupling History

  Male Contestant
  Female Contestant
  Sent a letter to
  Chose/Chosen for date in Inferno
  Chose and didn't go to Paradise
  Successfully paired and went to Paradise or Chosen/Chose someone to go to Paradise
  Failed to make a final pair
  Made a final pair

Episodes

Reception
It has been described as a Korean version of Bachelor in Paradise. The first season was released on December 18, 2021. Its second season was released on December 13, 2022. Single's Inferno has been ranked among  Netflix's Global Top 10 list, becoming the first Korean reality show to reach the list. It reached popularity in many regions and the hashtag #singlesinferno was trending on social media throughout its run. The third season was confirmed with changes in rules and location.

Controversies
There had been a handful of controversies during and after the show. While the show was popular as it was airing, some fans were irked by the amount of comments season one had on one contestant's, Shin Ji-Yeon, skin. In Korea, the beauty standard is to have "white skin." It is noticeable how often male and female contestants commented and complimented her white skin. Netizens criticized the way the show portrayed having "white skin" as something more desirable than not.

After season one, female contestant Song Ji-a received backlash for wearing fake luxury items. Because her content is about her high maintenance lifestyle and because she regularly shared reviews about certain luxury products, fans were disappointed by her admittance that the rumors of her wearing fake items were partially true. She has since apologized on her social media and deleted posts that showed these fake items.

Season two cast members, Jo Yoong-jae and Choi Seo-eun, were heavily criticized when the matched pair announced a fan meeting that would take place in February 2022. The tickets were  thousand, which netizens thought was highly priced. Many netizens thought the two were not celebrities and therefore should have treated a fan meeting as something more casual. A price of  thousand is usually what singers and actors priced their tickets for their fanmeets, and contestants from a dating show were not of the same caliber in many people's views. Them also announcing that they will be giving out autographs further irked netizens, as that would imply them to be celebrities rather than contestants on a show.

See also
Korean wave
Love Is Blind: Japan

References

External links
 
 
 

Television in Korea
Television shows filmed in South Korea
South Korean dating and relationship reality television series
Reality television series
Korean-language Netflix original programming
Television franchises
Reality television series franchises
2021 South Korean television series debuts
Korean-language television shows